Liberty Square is one of six "themed lands" and is exclusive to the Magic Kingdom, a theme park at the Walt Disney World Resort in Bay Lake, Florida. Themed after colonial America, Liberty Square contains replicas of both the Liberty Bell and Liberty Tree.  One of the most popular attractions in the Magic Kingdom, the Haunted Mansion, is located in this land. Presiding over the square is the Hall of Presidents, an American history show featuring an audio-animatronic figure of every President of the United States.  Liberty Square has a long waterfront on the Rivers of America and the Liberty Belle steam paddleboat departs from a landing here.

History
 
Originally conceived as an annex to Main Street U.S.A. for Disneyland in Anaheim, the idea was revisited when the Magic Kingdom was being designed in the late 1960s. The need arose for an area analogous to, but distinct from, New Orleans Square at Disneyland. Walt Disney Imagineering decided on an early American, eighteenth century theme, with special concentration on the American Revolutionary War, as the Bicentennial would occur soon in 1976.

Liberty Square opened as part of the Magic Kingdom and Walt Disney World's grand opening on October 1, 1971, as one of the original six themed lands.  It is located in the northwest corner, bordering Fantasyland and Frontierland.  The Square also has bridges to the park's central hub, as well as Adventureland.  Forming its western border is the Rivers of America, on which the Liberty Belle travels.  It is also the smallest land by guest area in the Magic Kingdom.

As of 2007, it is the only land yet to undergo a major refurbishment.  All of the attractions, original from October 1, 1971, still exist in some form or another. No major additions have been made.  The theming in the Square is comprehensive and accurate to the time period, from major architectural and engineering homages to the small antiques and artifacts peppered throughout the many attractions and dining locations.

On July 28, 2016, it was announced that a new live show, The Muppets Present…Great Moments in American History starring the Muppets, would be coming to the area outside Hall of Presidents in October 2016. The show took place throughout the day, with the Muppets sharing their own take on American history and a new song. The show was discontinued in 2019.

Design

 Liberty Square begins an architectural progression through history and geographically across the United States. This progression begins with the Haunted Mansion (1770s or '80s, upstate New York) and travels clockwise around the Rivers of America into Frontierland terminating at Big Thunder Mountain Railroad (1880s, southern California). 
 A replica of the House of Burgesses features Paul Revere's lanterns signifying "two if by sea" in an upstairs window. 
 The Liberty Tree is an actual 100-year-old oak found on the property and transplanted, with a younger oak grafted into the base.
 The Liberty Bell replica was cast from the mold of the actual Liberty Bell in 1989.  An urban legend falsely claims it is that it is one of two bells ever cast from this mold, however there are many others also cast from it. Yet another urban legend claims that this bell is the one that was cast for Pennsylvania, as one of the 50 cast for states in 1976. According to the legend, Pennsylvania gave it to Walt Disney World since they already had the original. However, Pennsylvania's replica is located in Allentown.
 There are architectural representations of each of the original 13 colonies.
 The state flags of each of the original 13 states, as well as the American flag, fly in a plaza in the center of Liberty Square.
 The brown pavement is meant to represent human waste (urine and excrement) since there was no indoor plumbing in colonial times. Urban legend

Attractions and entertainment

Current 
 The Hall of Presidents
 The Haunted Mansion
 Liberty Square Riverboat

Former 
Admiral Joe Fowler Riverboat
Mike Fink Keel Boats
The Muppets Present...Great Moments in American History

Restaurants
 Columbia Harbour House - a nautical-themed counter-service restaurant, notable for its seafood options and vegan "Lighthouse Sandwich".
Liberty Tree Tavern - a restaurant with a colonial theme, specifically that of New England. The menu includes tavern ham, pot roast, turkey, cheeseburgers, and Boston cream pie. Each room takes its name from a notable American Revolutionary War hero: Benjamin Franklin, George Washington, Martha Washington, John Paul Jones, Betsy Ross, and Thomas Jefferson.
 Sleepy Hollow - a quick-service restaurant located near Cinderella Castle, serving snacks and desserts.

Shops
 Heritage House
 Liberty Square Portrait Gallery
 Memento Mori
 Ye Olde Christmas Shoppe

References

 
Themed areas in Walt Disney Parks and Resorts
Magic Kingdom
1971 establishments in Florida
Amusement park attractions introduced in 1971